The Schick's Express and Transfer Co. was located in downtown Davenport, Iowa, United States. It was listed on the National Register of Historic Places in 1983. The building became part of the Petersen, Harned, von Maur department store complex.

History
Schick's Express and Transfer Company built this warehouse for its new headquarters in 1905. It was located on Front Street (now River Drive) not far from the Chicago, Milwaukee, St. Paul and Pacific Freight House, which made access to transportation routes efficient. Eventually the building was acquired by the Petersen, Harned, and Von Maur Department Store for use as a warehouse. It and the J.H.C. Petersen's Sons Wholesale Building were torn down in the early 21st century to make way for a parking structure and the Davenport Skybridge. It was delisted from the National Register in 2014.

Architecture
The building was an example of early Commercial architecture in Davenport. It was one of the few utilitarian buildings in Davenport that opened its walls with large windows, indicating the structure beneath its brick surface. It was also quite plain in appearance. The only decorative elements on the building were a restrained metal cornice, rustication at the corners, and stone jack arches.

References

Commercial buildings completed in 1905
Commercial architecture in Iowa
Former buildings and structures in Davenport, Iowa
Former National Register of Historic Places in Iowa
Commercial buildings on the National Register of Historic Places in Iowa
National Register of Historic Places in Davenport, Iowa
Demolished buildings and structures in Iowa
1905 establishments in Iowa